Minnette de Silva (1 February 1918 – 24 November 1998) was an internationally recognised architect, considered the pioneer of the modern architectural style in Sri Lanka. De Silva was a fellow of the Sri Lanka Institute of Architects.

De Silva was the first Sri Lankan woman to be trained as an architect and the first Asian woman to be elected an associate of the Royal Institute of British Architects (RIBA) in 1948. de Silva was also the first Asian representative of CIAM in 1947 and was one of the founding members of the Architectural publication Marg. Later in her life, she was awarded the SLIA Gold Medal for her contribution to Architecture in particular her pioneering work developing a 'regional modernism for the tropics'.

Early life (1918–1930)
Minnette de Silva was born on 1 February 1918 in Kandy to a well-known mixed-race family. Her father was George E. de Silva, a prominent Kandyan politician with a legacy of nearly thirty years. He was a SinhaleseBuddhist and was President of the Ceylon National Congress, and also served as a Minister of Health. Her mother, Agnes de Silva (née Nell), was a Burgher Christian who actively campaigned for universal suffrage in Sri Lanka. de Silva also recounts that her mother’s involvement in the Arts and Crafts Movement gave her the exposure to various traditions that are reflected in her later work as an architect. She was the youngest of five children. Her sister Anil de Silva was an art critic and historian. Her brother Fredrick de Silva was a lawyer and politician who served as Mayor of Kandy and later a member of Parliament. Fredrick was also Sri Lanka's Ambassador to France.

de Silva was first educated at the Kandy Convent at age 7 before being transferred to the Bishop’s College Boarding School in Colombo. In 1928, her family moved to England, where she schooled at St. Mary's, in Brighton, England. On her father’s request, she returned to Ceylon in the 1930s. de Silva did not complete her formal education, due to circumstances related to her father’s financial crisis and political life, and her mother’s ailing health.

She was not able to train as an architect in Colombo, so she had to persuade her father and her maternal uncle Dr Andreas Nell (1864-1956) to allow her to travel to Bombay to train at the Sir Jamsetjee Jeejebhoy School of Art.

Education (1930–1948)

India (1938–1942)
As de Silva did not complete her school matriculation, equivalent to today’s Advanced Level in Sri Lanka, she had to work as an apprentice for the Bombay-based firm, Mistri and Bhedwar, where she befriended Perin Mistri and her brother Minoo, and attended private classes at the Architectural Academy before enrolling at the Sir Jamsetjee Jeejebhoy School of Art. 

During her apprenticeship at Mistri and Bhedwar, she returned to Sri Lanka where she attended lectures at the Technical College, Colombo. She was also studying architecture at a private Academy of Architecture run by a leading architect in Bombay, G.B. Mhatres, where many influential practising architects of the time had taught. Among them were Homi Billmoria, Yahya Merchant, and M. Parelkar. She also assisted Shareef Mooloobhoy on his final portfolio.

de Silva was part of the cultural and political circles which included Mulk Raj Anand and Ravi Shankar and became the architectural editor for Marg, a new publication at the time on modern art and culture. 

Government School of Architecture

During the time of political upheaval in India, she attended a Free Gandhi March and as a result was expelled for not writing an apology to the head of the School. She then started working as the apprentice assistant to the émigré architect and planner Otto Koenigsberger in his office in Bangalore working on prefabricated housing for the Tata Steel City plan in Bihar. She was there for approximately seven months.

RIBA
Architectural Association (1945–1948)
During a brief visit to Ceylon, de Silva met Herwald Ramsbotham, the Governor-General of Ceylon, who took a keen interest in her situation and personally intervened in his capacity as head of the Education Committee in the UK and managed to arrange a place for her at the Architectural Association to allow her to take a special Royal Institute of British Architects examination for returning students for the War.

CIAM

de Silva was also the delegate representing India-Ceylon in the Congrès Internationaux D’Architecture Moderne (CIAM) from 1946 to 1957. It was here where she met Le Corbusier whom she maintained a long friendship with.

Career

Early career (1948–1962)

De Silva returned to Sri Lanka in 1949 on the insistence of her father, who requested her to make her contribution to the newly independent country. She returned to her parents’ home, St. George's, where she would start her architectural career without any money of her own. Although her parents would have liked her to take a reliable salaried position, she stayed in Kandy and pursued her career independently, as she had her roots there and it was the cultural and traditional centre of the nation. This was important to her as she had been brought up in an atmosphere of the patriotic political and cultural commitments of her parents to the community and the country. de Silva who as a child lived and moved among Kandyan artists and craftsmen would be taken by her parents to see the ancient Sinhalese architecture of the Anuradhapura and Polonnaruwa periods. Like her parents, she was greatly influenced by Ananda Coomaraswamy, who advocated for the preservation of the traditional arts and crafts, local craftsmen and the building methods and materials, and would be one of the first Sri Lankan architects to become a patron of the local craftsmen. She would develop her own style of architecture which is still apparent in the Sri Lankan architecture of today, and would be one of the first architects to incorporate building knowledge acquired in the West with that of Sri Lanka and India.

Her first building would be the Karunaratne House in Kandy. The 1949 commission came from friends of her parents Algy, who was a lawyer, and Letty Karunaratne, who asked her to build a house for Rs 40,000. She prepared plans for a split level house for a site on a hill, the first of a kind in Kandy. It was the first building designed by a woman in Sri Lanka and attracted much attention and controversy. She had to tackle many problems early on as a result of being the first and only woman architect in Sri Lanka. The fact that she worked independently in a male dominated sector, without a male partner nor an established firm, rendered distrust of contractors, businesses, the government and architectural patrons.

After completing the Karunaratne house in 1951, the rest of the 1950s would be de Silva's busiest decade throughout her career.

Travels (1962–1973)
In 1962 de Silva's mother died and she subsequently suffered from bouts of ill health and depression. Throughout the 1960s she travelled, spending long periods away from Sri Lanka and allowing her practice to falter. Her career started to decline just as Geoffrey Bawa began his.

In 1960 de Silva left Sri Lanka for 5 years, calling it her period of self-renewal. She spent this time travelling in Greece, Iran, Pakistan, and Afghanistan and revisited India. After her return to Sri Lanka she was engaged in the design of a series of large tourist hotels. De Silva's work and life are discussed in Flora Samuel's book Le Corbusier: Architect and Feminist.

London and Hong Kong (1973–1979)
With a change in government in Sri Lanka in the 1970s, de Silva and many others of the same outlook felt uncomfortable with the Bandaranaike government. In 1973 she closed her office and moved to London, renting a flat on Baker Street from Maxwell Fry and Jane Drew. While in London she wrote the whole section on South Asian architecture in the new (18th) edition of Banister Fletcher's A History of Architecture.

De Silva's work on A History of Architecture opened the doors for her to join the Department of Architecture, at the University of Hong Kong, where she was appointed lecturer in the History of Asian Architecture. She would stay in Hong Kong from 1975 to 1979 and pioneered a new way to  teach the History of Architecture in an Asian context. During this period she curated an exhibition that was shown at the Commonwealth Institute in London with the large collection of photographs of vernacular Asian architecture she had amassed. de Silva also had plans to write her own comprehensive history of Asian architecture for the Athlone Press, however this came to nothing.

Back in Kandy (1979–1998)

Upon her return to Kandy in 1979, de Silva tried to revive what was left of her architectural practice, but had difficulty in recruiting experienced staff. This would be the last phase of her architectural career but would only go on to complete three buildings. In 1982 de Silva settled down to work on the Kandy Art Association and Centenary Culture Centre in her hometown. The centre was designed with many levelled Kandyan flat tiled roofs and symbiotic indigenous features, thorana (gateways), midulas (open courts), mandapas (pavilions), rangahala (space for dance and music), avanhala (refectory).

The centre was designed as a large interactive space where a number of activities could take place with a strong symbiotic relationship of architecture and entertainment. The excavated area to the rear formed a natural amphitheatre, and the 150-year-old building adjoining the site became a focus of the new design. A Kandyan village setting with trees and plants was a pleasing foil to the Temple of the Tooth and the Malwatta Vihara (residence of the high priest of the sect). De Silva willed the Art Centre to be the most characteristic and living illustration in the region of a contemporary Kandyan Architecture.

Death 
Having always been plagued by financial insecurity, de Silva died penniless in a hospital in Kandy on 24 November 1998 at the age of 80. She had fallen from her bathtub, and was not found for days.

Legacy

Recognition
In 1996, two years before her death, after being largely ignored during much of her career, de Silva was awarded the Gold Medal by the Sri Lanka Institute of Architects.

Popular culture
The 2019 novel Plastic Emotions, by Shiromi Pinto, is a novel based on the real-life story of de Silva.

List of works

1940s
 Karunaratne House, Kandy (1947–51)
1950s
 Jinaraja College, Gampola (1950–51)
 Red Cross Hall, Kandy (1950) (Unbuilt)
 Day Nursery Extension, Kandy (1950) (Unbuilt)
 Pieris House I, Colombo (1952–6)
 Daswani House, Kandy (1952)
 House for businessman, Nawala (1952) (Never built)
 Wickremaratna House, Colombo (1953)
 Open Air Theatre for the Arts Council in Colombo, Colombo, (1953–54)
 C. H. Fernando House, Wellawatte (1954)
 Mrs. D. Wickremasinghe Flats, Colombo, (1954)
 Senanayake Flats, Colombo, (1954–57)
 Asoka Amarasinghe House, Kollupitiya (1954)
 Dr. Chandra Amarasinghe Flats, Colombo, (1954–55)
 Aluwihare Sports Pavilion, Police Park, Kandy (1955)
 Bunnie Molamure House, Bolgoda, (1955)
 Sri Rao House, Bangalore (1955) (Proposal)
 Ivor Fernando Flats, Colombo, (1956)
 V. Sachithanandam House, Colombo, (1956)
 Mrs. N. De Saram House, Colombo, (1956–57)
 Art Centre, Horana (1957) (Unbuilt)
 Dr. Perera House, Colombo, (1957–58)
 Watapuluwa Housing Scheme, Kandy (1958)
 Amaduwa Game Reserve Lodges, Kandy (1958) (Proposal)
 Sri Palee Open Air Theatre, University of Peradeniya, (1958–59)
 Ceylon Match Factory (1958)
 General Habibullah Defence Academy Chief's House, India, (1958–59)
 A. G. De Silva House, Cinnamon Gardens (1958–59)
 Kalkudah Sea Side Resort, Kalkudah (1959)
 Hikkaduwa Resr House, Hikkaduwa (1959) (Renovation)

1960s
 Chandra Amarasinghe House, Colombo, (1960)
 Dr. Hensman House, Ratmalana, (1960–61)
 Dr. P. H. Amarasinghe House, Colombo, (1960)
 Dr. Nadesan Villa, Kandy, (1960–61)
 R. G. Senanayake House, (1960–61)(Unbuilt)
 Keerthisinghe House, (1961)(Unbuilt)
 Pieris House II, Colombo (1963)
1970s
 Coomaraswamy Twin Houses, Colombo (1970)
 Seneviratne House, Kandy, (1972)
 Gamini Wickremasinghe Flat, Colombo, (1972)
 Dr. and Mrs. PVJ Jayasekera House, Kandy, (1974)
1980s
 Kandy Arts Centre, Kandy (1982–84)
1990s
 Segar House, Ja-Ela (1991)
 Siriwardene House, Colombo (1992)

Bibliography
 de Silva, Minnette The life & work of an Asian woman architect (Volume I), Colombo, 1998,

See also
 Geoffrey Bawa
 Andrew Boyd

References

Citations

Bibliography

External links
Various articles and links about Minnette de Silva
HECAR Foundation biography
https://thinkmatter.in/2015/03/04/andrew-boyd-and-minnette-de-silva-two-pioneers-of-modernism-in-ceylon/
https://www.architectural-review.com/essays/reputations/minnette-de-silva-1918-1998/10043925.article
https://www.theguardian.com/cities/2018/dec/14/minnette-de-silva-the-brilliant-female-architect-forgotten-by-history

1918 births
1998 deaths
20th-century Sri Lankan architects
20th-century women artists
Modernist architects
Organic architecture
Sri Lankan women architects
People from Kandy
Sinhalese architects
Architecture educators
Sir Jamsetjee Jeejebhoy School of Art alumni
Architectural Association School of Architecture
Academic staff of the University of Hong Kong
Associates of the Royal Institute of British Architects
Minnette
Sri Lankan expatriates in India